Southwest R-1 School District is a small rura school near Ludlow, Missouri. 
Southwest serves four local communities: Dawn, Ludlow, Mooresville, and Utica and has been fully accredited by the Department of Elementary and Secondary Education.

Education offered
Dual Credit Classes through ITV
A+ Program
Special Education

Sports
Basketball
Football
Softball
Baseball
Academic Team
Band
Choir
Track and Field
Cheerleading
Dance Team

Student organizations
FCCLA
FFA
FBLA
Hi-Step
NHS
FCA
Student Council

References

External links
 Southwest R-I School of  Ludlow, Missouri

Education in Livingston County, Missouri
School districts in Missouri
School districts established in 1958